Humberside was a European Parliament constituency, covering most of the former Humberside district of England.

Before its uniform adoption of proportional representation in 1999, the United Kingdom used first-past-the-post for the European elections in England, Scotland and Wales. The European Parliament constituencies used under that system were smaller than the later regional constituencies and only had one Member of the European Parliament each.

In 1999, the constituency became part of the much larger Yorkshire and the Humber constituency.

Boundaries 
1979-1984: Bridlington; Brigg and Scunthorpe; Haltemprice; Howden; Kingston upon Hull Central; Kingston upon Hull East; Kingston upon Hull West.

1984-1994: Beverley; Bridlington; Brigg and Cleethorpes; Great Grimsby; Kingston upon Hull East; Kingston upon Hull North; Kingston upon Hull West.

1994-1999: Beverley; Boothferry; Bridlington; Glanford and Scunthorpe; Kingston upon Hull East; Kingston upon Hull North; Kingston upon Hull West.

Members of the European Parliament

Results

References

External links
 David Boothroyd's United Kingdom Election Results 

European Parliament constituencies in England (1979–1999)
Politics of Lincolnshire
Politics of the East Riding of Yorkshire
Humberside
1979 establishments in England
1999 disestablishments in England
Constituencies established in 1979
Constituencies disestablished in 1999